Infortrend Technology is a Taiwanese technology company specializing in SAN and NAS storage systems. The company is headquartered in the Zhonghe District of New Taipei, Taiwan, and has regional headquarters in Tokyo, Sunnyvale, California, Beijing, Munich, and Basingstoke, UK.

History 
Infortrend was founded in 1993 in Taiwan, initially focusing on RAID controllers. The company gradually expanded its focus to include full RAID storage arrays.

In 2003 it started to ship its own-branded products when it launched the EonStor product series. Since then, its own-branded business has continued to grow, including product lines such as EonStor DS, ESVA and EonNAS.

Infortrend launched the world's first 8Gbit/s Fibre Channel-host (FC-host) RAID array, the world's first 16Gbit/s FC-host RAID array, 2.5"-drive RAID array, SAS-drive RAID array and SATA-drive RAID array.

Infortrend was listed on the Taiwan Stock Exchange in 2002.

Products 
The company's main product families include EonStor GS, EonStor GSe, EonStor GSe Pro and EonStor DS.

See also
 List of companies of Taiwan

External links
Businessweek Online - 'Asia's Hot Growth Companies: 2006 (ranked no.5) - Businessweek Online'

1993 establishments in Taiwan
Electronics companies established in 1993
Companies based in Taipei
Computer storage companies
Electronics companies of Taiwan
Taiwanese brands